Vaxi obliqua is a moth in the family Crambidae. It was described by George Hampson in 1919. It is found in Brazil's Amazon region.

References

Moths described in 1919